Andinodontis is a genus of ground beetles in the family Carabidae. There are at least four described species in Andinodontis.

Species
These four species belong to the genus Andinodontis:
 Andinodontis guzzettii Toledano & Erwin, 2010  (Bolivia)
 Andinodontis maveetyae Erwin & Maddison, 2010  (Peru)
 Andinodontis moreti Erwin & Toledano, 2010  (Ecuador)
 Andinodontis muellermotzfeldi Toledano & Erwin, 2010  (Ecuador)

References

Trechinae